The 2011 CECAFA Cup was an international football competition consisting of East and Central African national teams. It was the 35th edition of the annual CECAFA Cup. The tournament was hosted by Tanzania for the second consecutive year and seventh time overall.

The tournament received Sh823 million (approximately $450,000) sponsorship from Serengeti Breweries Limited which covered the fees of the tournament such as the air tickets of all delegates, accommodations and prize money to name a few. The competition was therefore known as the CECAFA Tusker Challenge Cup 2011.

Participants

 (invitees)

 (invitees)

The Council for East and Central Africa Football Associations (CECAFA) General Secretary Nicholas Musonye said that over 10 football associations applied to play as a guest team in the tournament.  Out of all the applicants, the final shortlist was trimmed to four; Côte d'Ivoire, Malawi, South Africa and Zambia.  However the Confederation of African Football (CAF) stated that Côte d'Ivoire and Zambia were not eligible to play in the competition as they had qualified for the 2012 Africa Cup of Nations.  Teams are not able to compete in another competition within a two-month period of the Africa Cup of Nations.

The invitation was eventually extended to Malawi.  However, it was then reported that they withdrew, citing financial constraints and lack of preparation time due to the late invitation.  Zimbabwe had then been invited to replace them but the Malawian government told the Football Association of Malawi to reconsider their participation in the tournament as they along with CECAFA will shoulder their expenses.

Eritrea were initially scheduled to participate but withdrew due to lack of funds and were replaced with Namibia.  It was suggested by some media outlets that Eritrean authorities were mindful of players attempting to seek political asylum whilst in Tanzania. Namibia eventually turned down the invitation, stating that it would disrupt the Namibia Premier League schedule.  They were replaced by Zimbabwe.

Squads

Group stage
All times are East Africa Time (EAT) – UTC+3

Group A

Group B

Group C

Ranking of third-placed teams
At the end of the first stage, a comparison was made between the third-placed teams of each group. The two best third-placed teams advanced to the quarter-finals.

Knockout stage

Quarter-finals

Semi-finals

Third place play-off

Final

Awards
The following were the awards of the tournament:

Individual awards
Best coach: Milutin Sredojević (Rwanda)
Best goalkeeper: Elmoiz Mahgoug (Sudan)
Best player: Haruna Niyonzima (Rwanda)
Best referee: Wiish Yabarow (Somalia)
Top scorers: Olivier Karekezi (Rwanda), Meddie Kagere (Rwanda), Emmanuel Okwi (Uganda)

Prize Money
Champions: Uganda – $30,000
Runner-up: Rwanda – $20,000
Third place: Sudan – $10,000

Goalscorers
5 goals

 Meddie Kagere
 Olivier Karekezi
 Emmanuel Okwi

2 goals

 Cédric Amissi
 Ahmed Hassan Daoud
 Jean-Baptiste Mugiraneza
 Mwinyi Kazimoto
 Isaac Isinde
 Dan Wagaluka
 Donald Ngoma

1 goal

 Floribert Ndayisaba
 Fuadi Ndayisenga
 Faty Papy
 Adane Girma
 Getaneh Kebede
 Bob Mugalia
 Pascal Ochieng
 John Banda
 Henry Kabichi
 Joseph Kamwendo
 Labama Bokota
 Jean-Claude Iranzi
 Khalid Ali
 Ramadan Agab
 Mohamed Shaikh Eldin
 Mowaia Fadasi
 Mohammed Musa
 Amir Rabea
 Muhannad El Tahir
 Nurdin Bakari
 Mrisho Ngassa
 Yusuf Rashid
 Thomas Ulimwengu
 Hamis Kizza
 Andrew Mwesigwa
 Mike Sserumaga
 Ali Badru Ali
 Abdulrahaman Mohammed
 Aggrey Morris
 Hamad Omar
 Kassim Suleiman Selembe
 Qadr Amini

Own goal

 Said Maulid (playing against Zimbabwe)
 Robert Odongkara (playing against Burundi)

Notes

References

External links
CECAFA Senior Challenge Cup 2011 at SoccerWay.com

 
CECAFA Cup
CECAFA Cup
International association football competitions hosted by Tanzania
CECAFA Cup
CECAFA Cup
CECAFA Cup